Elaphristis anthracitis is a species of moth of the family Noctuidae. It is found in Australia, where it has been recorded from Queensland.

The wingspan is about 16 mm. The forewings are fuscous with a fine blackish line from three-fourths of the costa to three-fourths of the hindmargin. There is an indistinct fine black curved subterminal line. The hindwings are whitish-fuscous. Adults have been recorded on wing in December.

References

Moths described in 1902
Hypeninae
Moths of Australia